Daria Dolan is an American business news anchor, author, and radio host.

Prior to her career in radio and television, Daria was a vice president of a New York Stock Exchange firm. Dolan holds an honorary doctorate in commercial sciences from St. Thomas Aquinas College in New York and a bachelor's degree in theater arts from Webster University in St. Louis.

She was an anchor, along with her husband of 46 years, Ken Dolan, for Dolans Unscripted on CNN. They joined CNN in 2003. The Dolans have written five books on personal finance and hosted several money seminars. Prior to joining CNN, they were contributors to CBS CBS This Morning and CBS News Saturday Morning and hosted their own show on the now defunct CNNfn. Ken died in 2018.

References

External links
The Dolans
WOR Radio Net: The Dolans

Year of birth missing (living people)
Living people
American finance and investment writers
American women journalists
American radio personalities
Webster University alumni
21st-century American women